Aelbrecht Bouts (1452 - March 1549) was a Flemish painter of the Early Netherlandish era.  His first name is sometimes spelled ‘Albert’, ‘Aelbert’ or ‘Albrecht’.  He was born into a family of painters in Leuven.  Aelbrecht’s father was Dieric Bouts the Elder (c. 1415-1475), and his brother was Dieric Bouts the Younger (c. 1448-1490).  Jan Bouts (c. 1478-c. 1530), son of Dieric Bouts the Younger, also became a painter.  Dieric Bouts the Younger inherited his father’s shop in 1475, while Aelbrecht established his own workshop, also in Leuven.  Whereas Dieric the Younger continued in his father's style, Aelbrecht developed his own unmistakable style with strong colors, rich texture and fine details.  He died in Leuven.

Bob Jones University Museum & Gallery (Greenville, South Carolina), the McNay Art Museum (San Antonio, Texas), the Cleveland Museum of Art, the Fitzwilliam Museum (Cambridge), Harvard University Art Museums, the Honolulu Museum of Art, the Hood Museum of Art (Hanover, New Hampshire), the Norton Simon Museum (Pasadena, California), the Nelson-Atkins Museum of Art (Kansas City, Missouri), the Royal Museums of Fine Arts of Belgium, the Czartoryski Museum and the Staatsgalerie Stuttgart are among the public collections having paintings by Aelbrecht Bouts.

See also
Ecce Homo and Mater Dolorosa Diptych

References
Friedländer, Max J. Early Netherlandish Painting. Translated by Heinz Norden. Leiden: Praeger, 1967-76 ASIN B0006BQGOW

External links

1450s births
1549 deaths
Early Netherlandish painters
Artists from Leuven
Renaissance painters